Tawa is a residential neighbourhood in the Mill Woods area of south Edmonton, Alberta, Canada.  It is a newer neighbourhood, with most of the development occurring in the early 1990s.  The Grey Nuns Community Hospital is located in the neighbourhood as is the Edmonton Police Service's South East Division Station.

Tawa is bounded on the north by 34 Avenue, on the south by 28 Avenue, on the west by 66 Street, and on the east by 50 Street.

Demographics 

Residential development 
One out of three (34%) of residences in Tawa are apartments, with the total number of apartments being split equally between walk up structures with fewer than five stories and high rise structures with five or more stories.  Another one in three residences (34%) are duplexes.  One in five residences (22%) are row houses.  A significant number of residences (12%) are part of collective residences.  There is a handful of single-family dwellings.  Approximately three out of every four residences are owner-occupied, with the remainder being rented.

The average household in Tawa has 2.3 people, with two out of three households having either one or two persons.

Household income 
Incomes in the neighbourhood are slightly below the city average.

Surrounding neighbourhoods

References

External links 
Tawa Neighbourhood Profile

Neighbourhoods in Edmonton